Sajjad Khan (born 28 December 1951) is an Indian actor and singer. Born into poverty in the Bombay slums, he became the adopted son of Bollywood filmmaker Mehboob Khan, founder of Mehboob Studios. He worked in a handful of Indian films, debuting in his father's Academy Award-nominated Mother India (1957) and its sequel Son of India (1962). He later found more success overseas, working in international productions, including films and television shows in North America, such as Maya (1966) and its television adaptation, as well as the Philippines and United Kingdom. He was a teen idol in North America and the Philippines from the late 1960s to early 1970s.

Early life and debut
Sajid was a poor child from the slums of Bombay (now Mumbai), in India's then Bombay State (now Maharashtra), before he was discovered by Bollywood filmmaker Mehboob Khan. Sajid started acting as a child appearing as the younger version of Sunil Dutt's character Birju in Mehboob Khan's Academy Award-nominated Hindi film Mother India (1957). Sajid was unknown at the time. He was later adopted by Mehboob Khan and his wife Sardar Akhtar, who named him Sajid Khan.

Career
After his debut in Mother India in 1957, he played the title role in his adopted father's next and last film Son of India in 1962. According to Rauf Ahmed, though the film was not a success at the box-office, Sajid's performance was praised by the critics. After his father's death in 1964, Sajid was sent to the United States by his adoptive mother, Sardar Akhtar.

He went on to achieve fame in the United States with a co-starring role alongside Jay North in the 1966 film Maya. The film's success led to a television series of the same name airing on NBC from September 1967 to February 1968 and lasting 18 episodes. The show led to Sajid becoming a "teen idol" for a short time, appearing on the cover of popular magazines worldwide. He also had a short-lived singing career but was not successful. In 1968, he guest-starred in an episode of the television series The Big Valley, and appeared in the music variety show It's Happening as a guest judge.

He also found success in the Philippines in the early 1970s, starring as the male lead in a number of romantic comedy films opposite leading Philippine actresses Nora Aunor and Vilma Santos. He tried to get back into Hindi films, but none of his Hindi films from 1972 to 1983 worked financially. His career's peak period was in 1966–1974 and he was more successful in English films. His last film appearance was in the Merchant Ivory film Heat and Dust in 1983, where he played the role of "dacoit chief," seen fleetingly in only one scene with no spoken dialogue whatsoever.

Current activities
Sajid was married to a lady whose name is not known, and they became the parents of a son named Sameer. Sajid and his wife got divorced in 1990.

Sajid acted in films from 1957 (Mother India) to 1983 (Heat and Dust). However, by the early 1970s, his career was more or less over. It is reported that, around this time, Sajid opened a retail store with a small workshop in the back which made costume jewellery. 'Artistic' was the name of the retail store, located in India.

In the late 1960s, the actress Rekha was struggling to gain a foothold in films. She was a south Indian who spoke Hindi badly but whose English was good. At this time, several English language films and TV serials with an Indian theme were being made, like Jungle Book and Maya. So, she thought of looking for roles as an Indian woman in foreign language films. She approached Sajid, who was himself acting in Maya, and he tried to help her get some a bit role in the film, but failed. Shortly afterwards, Rekha made her Hindi language debut with Sawan Bhadon (1970), which was a hit, and her career in Hindi films was assured.

Filmography

Films
 Mother India (1957) .... Young Birju (child artist)
 Son of India (1962)
 Maya (1966) ... Raji
 The Prince and I (1971-Philippines) from Tower Productions, leading lady: Maritess Revilla
 My Funny Girl (1971-Philippines) from Tower Productions, leading lady: Tina Revilla
 The Singing Filipina (1971-Philippines) from Tower Productions, leading lady: Nora Aunor
 Savera (1972)
 Mahatma and the Mad Boy (1974) Short drama (27 min) directed by Ismail Merchant boxed as Merchant Ivory in India with Heat and Dust etc.: The Mad Boy
 Zindagi Aur Toofan (1975)
 Mandir Masjid (1977)
 Dahshat (1981)
 Heat and Dust (1983)
 Pilak (2001)

Television
 Maya (1967–1968, 18 episodes) .... Raji
 It's Happening - (1968, 2 episodes) .... Himself
 The Big Valley - (1969, 1 episode, "The Royal Road") .... Prince Ranjit Singh / Jahan
 1857 Kranti (TV series) (2000)

Discography

Singles

Albums

Sajid (1969) (Colgems COS-114) 

 A Song Inside 
 Everything is You 
 Moon River 
 I Love How You Love Me 
 This Guy's In Love With You 
 Dream 
 Smile 
 A Closed Heart Gathers No Love 
 Someday 
 Ha Ram (Of Love And Peace) 
 Getting to Know You

References

External links

1951 births
Living people
Colgems Records artists
Indian male child actors
Indian male film actors
Indian male television actors
Indian Muslims